Manchester College might refer to:

England
 Manchester College, a former name of Harris Manchester College, Oxford
Manchester Metropolitan University, formerly Manchester Polytechnic, formed in 1977 by a merger between Manchester College of Art and Design and Manchester College of Commerce; in 1983 the City of Manchester College of Higher Education was also folded in
The Manchester College, formed in 2008 by a merger between
City College Manchester, a network of further education colleges 
Manchester College of Arts and Technology

United States
Manchester College (Indiana), a university in North Manchester, Indiana
Manchester Community College (Connecticut) in Manchester, Connecticut
Manchester Community College (New Hampshire) in Manchester, New Hampshire

See also
:Category:Education in Manchester

Education in Manchester